John Crawley (26 April 1703 – 9 September 1767) was an English landowner and politician.

Early life
Crawley was born on 26 April 1703 in an old Luton family. He was the eldest son of Sarah ( Dashwood) Crawley, and Richard Crawley, Registrar of the Admiralty and MP for Wendover. Among his siblings were Sarah Crawley and Samuel Crawley, British consul in Smyrna. 

His maternal grandparents were Anne ( Smith) Dashwood (a daughter of John Smith of Tedworth and sister to John Smith, Chancellor of the Exchequer) and Sir Samuel Dashwood, Lord Mayor of London and MP for the City of London. His paternal grandparents were Mary ( Clutterbuck) Crawley (a daughter of London merchant Richard Clutterbuck) and Francis Crawley of Northaw, Baron of the Exchequer (son of Sir Francis Crawley, who was appointed Justice of the Common Pleas by the king in 1632, but was disabled by Parliament).

Career
He succeeded to his father's estates in 1712. He was High Sheriff of Bedfordshire from 1735 to 1737. In 1740, Crawley built Stockwood House in Luton, which his father bought in 1708.

In 1734, Crawley unsuccessfully contested Great Bedwyn as a Tory on the interest of the Bruce family, who had a long connection with Bedfordshire. Three years later Lord Bruce was able to provide him with a seat at Marlborough until 1747, after which he did not stand. In Parliament he voted against the Administration in all recorded divisions.

Personal life
On 29 May 1740, Crawley married Susannah Sambrooke, a daughter of Sir Samuel Sambrooke, 3rd Baronet, of Bush Hill, Edmonton. Her brother was Sir Jeremy Sambrooke, 4th Baronet, MP for Bedford. Together, they were the parents of two sons and two daughters, including:

 John Crawley (1743–1815), who married Elizabeth Hawley, a daughter of Dr. James Hawley of Leybourne Grange; her brother was Sir Henry Hawley, 1st Baronet.
 Susanna Crawley (1744–1830), who married the Rev. John Keet.
 Sarah Crawley, who in 1784 married Thomas Halsey of Gaddesden Place, MP for Hertfordshire.
 Samuel Crawley (d. 1805), who bought the Dunham estate and married Eliza Rankin, heiress of Ragnall Hall, in 1788.

Crawley died on 9 September 1767. His estates were inherited by his eldest son John. Upon John's death in 1815, the estates passed to his nephew, Samuel Crawley. His estate, Stockwood House, was demolished in 1964 and, today, is the site of Stockwood Park.

Descendants
Through his daughter Sarah, he was a grandfather of Sarah Halsey (d. 1864), who inherited the Halsey family estates and married Rev. John Fitz Moore and Joseph Thompson Whately (both of whom adopted the surname Halsey), MP for St Albans. Sarah's daughter, Georgiana Theodosia Halsey, married Col. Leopold Grimston Paget (youngest son of Berkeley Paget, MP, and a grandson of Henry Paget, 1st Earl of Uxbridge). Sarah's son Thomas Plumer Halsey, MP for Hertfordshire, whose descendants became the Halsey baronets.

Through his younger son Samuel, he was a grandfather of Samuel Crawley (1790–1852), who inherited the Stockwood, Dunham and Ragnall estates. He served as MP for Honiton and Bedford.

References

}

1703 births
1767 deaths
High Sheriffs of Bedfordshire
Members of the Parliament of Great Britain for English constituencies
British MPs 1734–1741
British MPs 1741–1747